Dato' Rosalind Singha Ang  (born 1941 in Yala Province) is a former badminton player from Malaysia. Her parents were Malaysians of Chinese descent.

Career 
The woman who has been labeled as the shuttle queen Rosalind Singha Ang crafted her name through badminton.  Ang made the headlines in her international debut, by winning the SEAP Games singles gold medal in 1965 and ended her international career in glory by lifting the 1975 SEAP Games singles, mixed doubles and team gold medals. The most memorable triumph Rosalind made was the capturing of the 1966 Asian Games in Bangkok with Teh Kew San in the mixed doubles.

Achievements

Asian Games 
Women's doubles

Mixed doubles

Asian Championships 
Women's doubles

Southeast Asian Peninsular Games/Southeast Asian Games 
Women's singles

Women's doubles

Mixed doubles

Commonwealth Games 
Women's doubles

International tournaments 
Women's singles

Women's doubles

Mixed doubles

Invitational tournament 

Women's doubles

Honours 

 :
 Member of the Order of the Defender of the Realm (A.M.N., 1978)
 :
 Knight Companion Exalted Order of Kedah (D.S.D.K., 2013) – Dato'

References 

1941 births
Malaysian female badminton players
Malaysian people of Thai descent
Rosalind Singha Ang
Asian Games medalists in badminton
Badminton players at the 1966 Asian Games
Badminton players at the 1970 Asian Games
Badminton players at the 1970 British Commonwealth Games
Commonwealth Games bronze medallists for Malaysia
Living people
Malaysian sportspeople of Chinese descent
Commonwealth Games medallists in badminton
Asian Games gold medalists for Malaysia
Asian Games bronze medalists for Malaysia
Southeast Asian Games gold medalists for Malaysia
Southeast Asian Games medalists in badminton
Members of the Order of the Defender of the Realm
Medalists at the 1970 Asian Games
Competitors at the 1965 Southeast Asian Peninsular Games
Competitors at the 1967 Southeast Asian Peninsular Games
Competitors at the 1969 Southeast Asian Peninsular Games
Competitors at the 1971 Southeast Asian Peninsular Games
Competitors at the 1973 Southeast Asian Peninsular Games
Competitors at the 1975 Southeast Asian Peninsular Games
Competitors at the 1977 Southeast Asian Games
Rosalind Singha Ang
Medallists at the 1970 British Commonwealth Games